Stagecoach to Monterey is a 1944 American Western film directed by Lesley Selander, written by Norman S. Hall, and starring Allan Lane, Peggy Stewart, Wally Vernon, Twinkle Watts, Tom London and LeRoy Mason. It was released on September 15, 1944, by Republic Pictures.

Plot

Cast  
Allan Lane as Bruce Redmond posing as Chick Weaver
Peggy Stewart as Jessie Wade
Wally Vernon as Throckmorton 'Other-Hand' Snodgrass
Twinkle Watts as Inky Wade
Tom London as Chester Wade
LeRoy Mason as Black Jack Barstow
Roy Barcroft as J. Rodney Stevens
Kenne Duncan as Henchman Joe
Bud Geary as Henchman Gans
Carl Sepulveda as Henchman Roy
Jack Kirk as Bartender Fred
Fred Graham as Henchman Mac

References

External links 
 

1944 films
1940s English-language films
American Western (genre) films
1944 Western (genre) films
Republic Pictures films
Films directed by Lesley Selander
American black-and-white films
1940s American films